A coupé was a four-wheeled carriage with outside front seat for the driver and enclosed passenger seats for two persons. The first coupés in France were the 2-seat variant of the 4-seat Berline called a "Berlingot". The first Brougham appeared in 1838.

See also 
 Coach (carriage)

References

Carriages